Paulina is an unincorporated community located in Blairstown in Warren County, New Jersey, United States.

History
Around 1768, William Armstrong constructed a grist mill there, which remained for more than a century.  A second grist mill was constructed in Paulina in 1783 by Peter B. Shafer.  That mill was later used as an axe-helve factory and saw mill.

By 1851, Paulina had a post office, and by 1882 the population was 110.  In 1890, a grist mill was still located there.

Today

References

Blairstown, New Jersey
Unincorporated communities in Warren County, New Jersey
Unincorporated communities in New Jersey